Byker Grove is a British teen drama and coming of age television series which aired between 1989 and 2006 as part of CBBC on BBC One. Set and filmed in Byker, Newcastle upon Tyne, it was created by writer Adele Rose and executive producer Andrea Wonfor. The show was broadcast at 5:10 pm after Newsround (later moved to 5 pm). It was aimed at an older teenager and young adult audience, tackling serious and sometimes controversial storylines. The show is notable for depicting the first gay kiss on children’s television, as well as its breach of the fourth wall in the final series.

History
The show ran between 1989 and 2006, and was set in a youth club in the Byker district of Newcastle Upon Tyne, England. In 1987, Wonfor approached soap writer Adele Rose. Together they created a single pilot episode featuring children aged 8–11 at an out-of-school club (transmitted on BBC in 1988). In autumn 1988, Wonfor gained the backing of Anna Home, then Head of the Children's Department at BBC Television. Home gave the go ahead for a run of a series of six 25-minute episodes to be broadcast by the BBC. The age of the main characters was raised to 12–16 after support from first producer-director, Matthew Robinson. The first series centred on young teenagers crossing the bridge from childhood to adulthood.

Production

Byker Grove was not filmed in the Byker area of Newcastle. The actual youth club set was in Benwell, which is in the west area of the city, Byker being in the east. Byker Metro station (the suburban rail network in Newcastle and the Tyne and Wear area) and other landmarks in the real Byker (such as the Byker Wall and surrounding estate) were used for filming backdrops.

The youth club building seen on-screen is The Mitre, which used to be a nightclub and a pub (which was mentioned in a few storylines from episodes in the late 1990s). After the success of the first series (6 episodes, 1989), The Mitre was bought by the BBC's London property department, which then granted Zenith Television a permanent licence to film the series there. 

Scenes representing Denwell Burn Youth Club for Series 15 were filmed at Raby Street Youth Club, in the buildings next to Byker Primary School. This is the real youth club for the children of Byker. 

The final series started on 7 October 2006 on the CBBC Channel. Richard Deverell, head of CBBC, was interviewed on Newsround about the decision to axe Byker Grove.

Cast
Byker Grove launched the careers of Anthony McPartlin ("P.J.") and Declan Donnelly ("Duncan"), who are otherwise known as Ant & Dec, as well as the actress Jill Halfpenny, Donna Air, former CBBC presenter Andrew Hayden-Smith and Emmerdale actors Dale Meeks, Charlie Hardwick, Chelsea Halfpenny, Laura Norton and Victoria Hawkins. Also appearing in the series was the now glamour model Francoise Boufhal ("Ellie Baines") and Charlie Hunnam, who later starred in the American TV series Sons of Anarchy and co-starred in Pacific Rim (2013).

The cast and crew from the first 10 years of the show held their first reunion on 19 May 2012 in the Quayside area of Newcastle upon Tyne and on a river boat cruise. The party guests included Ant and Dec, Donna Air, Charlie Hardwick and Andrew Hayden-Smith.

Production team
The founder producer/director (1989–95) was Matthew Robinson. After being promoted to become executive producer of Byker Grove for two years (1995–97), he became executive producer of EastEnders, then Head of Drama for BBC Wales, and now runs Khmer Mekong Films in Cambodia. Byker Grove was also home to writers such as Catherine Johnson (who went on to pen Mamma Mia!, the ABBA musical) and Matthew Graham (This Life, Doctor Who and co-creator of BBC One's Life on Mars). The first writer was Adele Rose–in Series 1 she wrote episodes 1–4 and 6; her daughter, Carrie Rose, wrote episode 5. The most prolific writer was Brian B. Thompson, who wrote 50 episodes over 12 series. Byker Grove gave Academy Award-winning director Tom Hooper his first break into TV drama when he directed four episodes in 1997.

Storylines
Byker Grove was not intended for young children, but aimed at a young adult and teenage audience, as it tackled controversial subjects such as drug addiction, child abuse, homelessness, teen pregnancy, homophobia, and abortion. Although some of the action took place outside the youth club, the series was unusual among dramas in that the characters were rarely shown in school. One of the major settings was the foster home run by the kindly but strict Lou Gallagher, the longest-running character.

In November 1994, Byker Grove featured the first gay kiss on UK children's television. It broached the subject of "coming out" when Noddy Fishwick kissed his close friend Gary Hendrix at the back of a cinema. This scene caused outrage in the British tabloids and calls for producer Matthew Robinson to be sacked. However, the BBC strongly backed the storyline, which received countrywide support from gay teenagers, many teachers, and parents. The 2004 series saw the character of Bradley agonising over his sexuality and eventually coming out as gay to his girlfriend Sadie, after a romantic holiday together had failed to live up to their expectations.

The series frequently depicted life as unjust, with bad things happening to good people, such as Flora's death from a brain tumour, Greg's fall from the roof of the Grove which left him paralysed from the waist down, Jemma Dobson being electrocuted by a faulty electricity mains socket and youth leader Geoff Keegan's death in an accidental gas explosion after 11 years on the show.

Byker Grove frequently confronted viewers with repercussions for the characters' actions, often permanent. These ranged from the comical to the tragic; characters who stole and joy-rode cars often died in them, starting with Gill, and ultimately Craig running over Ben Carter. P.J. was blinded during an illicit and unsupervised paintballing session, in which he ignored warnings and removed his face guard, in a scene filmed on location at Aydon Castle near Corbridge.

The central storyline of the first three series was the character of London teenager Julie Warner (Lucy Walsh) struggling to fit in and adjust to life in working class Newcastle and her relationship with the rebellious Martin "Gill" Gillespie. In the show's final episode the characters discover that they do not exist and are the creation of unseen characters known as "The Writers" who plan to conclude the show by demolishing the Grove. However numerous present and former Grove members buy enough time for the characters to re-write the ending so that the club will remain open forever, but ultimately fail to stop it being demolished.

Until Series 10 (1998) the rival youth club was known as Denton Burn. In Series 13 (2001) rival youth club members were known as the Denwell Burners as they were from a youth club in Denwell Burn. This is a fictitious area of Newcastle upon Tyne, the name coming from a mixture of Benwell and Denton Burn.

The bands of Byker Grove
A number of musical acts have been spun off from the series. These include:
 Michelle Charles (under the guise of Charley, which was her character name) – "The Best Thing", "For the Good Times"
 PJ & Duncan — who became Ant & Dec for The Cult of... album (Singles include "Let's Get Ready to Rhumble", "Better Watch Out", "We're On The Ball")
 Byker Grooove – girl band starring Donna Air ('Charlie'), Jayni Hoy ('Leah') and Vicky Taylor ('Angel') whose single "Love Your Sexy...!!" reached No. 48 on the UK Singles Chart in December 1994. Byker Grooove evolved into the duo Crush with Jayni Hoy and Donna Air. (Singles included "Jellyhead" (UK No. 50) and "Luv'd Up" (UK No. 45) on Telstar Records.) In the United States, where Byker Grove did not air and nor was the Crush duo promoted as being associated with the series, "Jellyhead" reached No. 72 on the Billboard Hot 100 in December 1996. The song "Jellyhead" also charted in Australia from early February 1997, peaking at No. 32 in early April 1997, spending 23 weeks within the ARIA Top 100 Singles chart, 13 of which were in the Top 50.
 Summer Matthews – aka Emma Miller (Single: "Little Miss Perfect")
 Point Break, boyband featuring Brett Adams ('Noddy') and David Oliver ('Marcus'). (Singles include "Do We Rock", "Stand Tough", and "Freakytime" on Eternal Records.)

Other bands connected to Byker Grove include:
 Freefaller – includes David Oliver of Point Break
 Kane Gang – writers of the original theme music, a development from the "Ooh Gary Davies on your radio" jingle for BBC Radio 1.

List of characters in Byker Grove

Grove staff
There have been several youth leaders working at the Grove over the years. The following is a list of all the ones shown on-screen.

Grove members
This is a list of characters who appeared in the show as members of the Grove from 1989 to 2006. (When surname is not listed, it is either unknown, or was never mentioned in the show)

* Indicates character was still in the show when it finished.

+ In the books that accompanied the series, Duncan's surname was listed as MacDonald until 1992, despite it being stated in the show in his 1st appearance (Series 1, Episode 3) that it is Sperring.

Parents
Although most of the action took place in the Grove, several characters' home lives and families were also shown. Some families remained in the show for many years. The house next door to the Grove was home to the Dobson family (1990–93) followed by the Turnbulls (1993–97) and then the Watsons (1998–2000). Other long-running families included the O'Hagans, the Carters and the various children at Lou Gallagher's foster home.

See also
 CBBC
 Grange Hill
 Children's Ward

References

External links
 Geograph Page - The Mitre, Benwell
 
 
 Byker Grove episode guide 
 Byker Grove cast list 

Ant & Dec
1989 British television series debuts
2006 British television series endings
1980s British children's television series
1990s British children's television series
2000s British children's television series
BBC children's television shows
English-language television shows
Television series about teenagers
Television shows set in Tyne and Wear
Television shows set in Newcastle upon Tyne
British teen drama television series
1990s British LGBT-related drama television series
2000s British LGBT-related drama television series